Lilay Huser, formerly Lilay Erincin (born 1958) is a German-Turkish actress.

Career 
Huser was born in Turkey. With a diploma in textile engineering, she emigrated to Krefeld in 1978 for her studies, and later to Wuppertal. By that time Huser already had an affinity for the theater. From 1986 onwards, for example, she worked increasingly in the intercultural theater scene of North Rhine-Westphalia, such as acting at the Arkadas Theater in Cologne and co-founding the Wupper-Theater.

Huser has acted in film roles since 2000, often on television in TV crime shows like Tatort. Her most notable roles are "Fatma Melek" in König von Kreuzberg (2005) and "Grandma Öztürk" in Türkisch für Anfänger (2008). She landed several other major roles in films such as Chiko (2008),  (2008), What a Man (2011), and in one of the main roles in Almanya - Welcome to Germany (2011), along with her former husband Vedat Erincin.

Filmography (selection) 
 2005: König von Kreuzberg
 2008: Türkisch für Anfänger
 2008: Chiko
 2008: 
 2011: Almanya: Welcome to Germany
 2011: What a Man
 2013: 
 2013: King Ping – Tap Taps Tödchen
 2014: Monaco 110: Einstand
 2015: 
 2016: Alarm für Cobra 11 – Die Autobahnpolizei
 2016: Die Pfefferkörner: Goldqueen Loves You

External links 
 
 Lilay Huser: Oma Öztürk ganz privat WZ vom 21. November 2008

Turkish film actresses
German film actresses
Turkish stage actresses
German stage actresses
1958 births
Living people
German people of Turkish descent
Turkish emigrants to West Germany
Date of birth missing (living people)
People from Wuppertal